Poor Relations is a 1919 American silent drama film directed by King Vidor. Produced by the Brentwood Corporation, the film starred Vidor’s wife Florence Vidor and featured comedienne Zasu Pitts.

The picture is the final of four Christian Science precept films that represent a brief phase in Vidor’s output championing the superiority of self-healing through moral strength and supplemented by the benefits of rural living.

Plot
Country girl Dorothy Perkins succeeds as an architect in the city, but then is scorned by her old-money in-laws.

Cast
 Florence Vidor as Dorothy Perkins
 Lillian Leighton as Ma Perkins
 William De Vaull as Pa Perkins (as William Du Vaull)
 Roscoe Karns as Henry
 ZaSu Pitts as Daisy Perkins
 Charles Meredith as Monty Rhodes

Reception
The reviews were "poor". Exhibitors Trade Review observed that "the slender, fragile story has just about all it can do to make its way through the new-mown hay atmosphere."

Theme
Poor Relations provides an early example of Vidor’s “feminist” presentation of professional and independent women, emphasizing reciprocal exchanges between the sexes.

Footnotes

References
Baxter, John. 1976. King Vidor. Simon & Schuster, Inc. Monarch Film Studies. LOC Card Number 75-23544.
Durgnat, Raymond and Simmon, Scott. 1988. King Vidor, American. University of California Press, Berkeley. 
Gustafsson, Fredrik. 2016. King Vidor, An American Romantic La furia umana. LFU/28 Winter 2016. http://www.lafuriaumana.it/index.php/61-archive/lfu-28/548-fredrik-gustafsson-king-vidor-an-american-romantic  Retrieved 4 June 2020.

External links

1919 films
Silent American drama films
Films directed by King Vidor
American silent feature films
1919 drama films
American black-and-white films
Film Booking Offices of America films
1910s American films